Barbara von Grebel-Schiendorfer (born 27 September 1950) is a Swiss equestrian. She competed in two events at the 1996 Summer Olympics.

References

External links
 

1950 births
Living people
Swiss female equestrians
Olympic equestrians of Switzerland
Equestrians at the 1996 Summer Olympics
Sportspeople from Zürich
20th-century Swiss women